Tamerlane chess is a medieval chess variant. Like modern chess, it is derived from shatranj. It was developed in Central Asia during the reign of Emperor Timur, and its invention is also attributed to him. Because Tamerlane chess is a larger variant of chaturanga, it is also called Shatranj Al-Kabir (Large chess or Great chess), as opposed to Shatranj ash-shaghir ("Small Chess"). Although the game is similar to modern chess, it is distinctive in that there are varieties of pawn, each of which promotes in its own way.

Board
A Tamerlane chessboard is made up of 110 uncheckered squares arranged in a 10×11 pattern ("camp"). Additional squares, known as citadels, protrude from the left side on the ninth row and from the right side on the second row, making a total of 112 squares. When the opposing king occupies a player's citadel, the game is declared a draw. No piece other than a king may occupy a citadel. 

There are several ways for an opening setup to be arranged. A common one is as follows:
 White's side (bottom row, from the left): elephant, (space), camel, (space), war machine, (space), war machine, (space), camel, (space), elephant.
 Second row (from the left): rook, knight, picket, giraffe, general, king, vizier, giraffe, picket, knight, rook.
 Third row (from the left): pawn of pawns, pawn of war engines, pawn of camels, pawn of elephants, pawn of general, pawn of king, pawn of vizier, pawn of giraffes, pawn of pickets, pawn of knights, pawn of rooks.

Black's side mirrors White's.

Pieces

Anglicised versions of piece names are also given here. 
 king (shah) – Moves as a traditional king, but once during the game it may switch places with any of its own pieces to evade check/checkmate or stalemate. 
 general or counsellor (ferz) – Moves one square diagonally
 vizier or governor (wazir) – Moves one square horizontally or vertically
 giraffe (zurafa) – Moves one square diagonally and then a minimum of three squares horizontally or vertically (a restricted gryphon)
 picket (tali'a) – Moves as a bishop in traditional chess, but must move a minimum of two squares
 knight (faras) – Moves as a knight in traditional chess
 rook (rukh) – Moves as a rook in traditional chess
 elephant (pil) – Moves two squares diagonally and is unobstructed by pieces in between
 camel (jamal/shutur) – Moves one diagonally and two straight, unobstructed by pieces in between. It moves in an "L"-shape, like an orthodox chess knight, with dimensions 3×1 instead of 2×1.
 war engine (dabbaba) – Moves two horizontally or vertically, unobstructed by pieces in-between
 pawns – Move as pawns in traditional chess, but with no initial double move or en passant capture. Every piece (including the pawn) has a corresponding pawn. Hence; pawn of king, pawn of vizier, pawn of giraffes, etc.

Rules

Beginning the game
The player going first is determined by a roll of dice.

The object
The object of Tamerlane chess, as in modern chess, is to checkmate the opposing shah (king). Unlike in modern chess, stalemating an opponent is also a win.

Promotion
Upon reaching the last rank on the board, a pawn is promoted to its corresponding piece. Thus, the pawn of giraffes becomes a giraffe, etc. Exceptions to this are the pawn of kings and pawn of pawns.

A pawn of kings becomes a prince. It moves as a king. If both a prince and a king exist simultaneously on the board, one of the two must be captured [like a regular piece] before the other can be checked/checkmated or stalemated to win the game.

When the pawn of pawns reaches the last rank, it stays there and cannot be . As soon as a situation develops where the opponent cannot escape losing a piece to a pawn, or where a pawn may attack two opposing units simultaneously (forked), the player must move his/her pawn to that location. It moves to this location even if the square is occupied, either by an allied or opposing piece. The piece occupying the square is removed from the board. On the pawn's next move, it may capture any piece it is attacking. It then continues forward on the board as a pawn. Upon the second promotion of this pawn, it moves to the starting point of the pawn of king.  Upon the third promotion it becomes an adventitious king, which has the moves of the king, with one special exception as described in the next section. If an adventitious king exists on the board simultaneously with a prince and/or a king, they must be captured like a regular piece until only one remains, which must then be checkmated or stalemated to win.

The citadels
The two extra squares that protrude from the left of the ninth rank and the right of the second rank are called citadels (husun, singular hisn). If, at any time during the game a player can move his king into his opponent's citadel, he can declare the game a draw. This is advantageous for a losing player as being stalemated is considered a loss in Tamerlane chess. Alternatively, if a player has a prince or adventitious king on the board when his shah enters his opponent's citadel, his shah can trade places with either of those pieces, and the game continues. The prince or adventitious king can later move out of the citadel to make way for the king to enter again, but the exchange privilege may only be used once. 

The shah (king) ranks higher than the prince, which ranks higher than the adventitious king. Only the highest ranking of the three on the board can enter the opponent's citadel. 

The adventitious king has the special honor of being the only piece on the board that can enter his own citadel. Upon entering, it becomes immune, thus blocking the opponent from entering the citadel and declaring a draw.

Other
Once during the game a player may exchange a checked king for another non-royal piece. A player may move into check if he holds multiple kings. There is no castling or en passant moves in Tamerlane chess. Baring the opponent's king is not considered a win in Tamerlane chess, as the bared king still has the chance to enter the opponent's citadel. There is no three-fold repetition or 50-move draw in Tamerlane chess.

Full Tamerlane chess
In a few manuscripts the empty squares on the back rank are filled with new types of pieces. The following setup appears in ms 7322 (British Museum):

Elephant (a1), Lion (b1), Knight (c1), Bull (d1), War Engine (e1), Revealer (f1), War Engine (g1), Bull (h1), Camel (i1), Lion (j1), Elephant (k1)
Rook (a2), Knight (b2), Picket (c2), Giraffe (d2), General (e2), King (f2), Sea Monster (g2), Giraffe (h2), Picket (i2), Knight (j2), Rook (k2)
Pawn of Pawns (a3), Pawn of Knights (b3), Pawn of Camels (c3), Pawn of War Engines (d3), Pawn of Generals (e3), Pawn of Kings (f3), Pawn of Sea Monsters (g3), Pawn of Giraffes (h3), Pawn of Pickets (i3), Pawn of Lions (j3), Pawn of Rooks (k3)
Pawn of Bulls (c4), Pawn of Revealers (f4), Pawn of Elephants (i4).

Black's 1st, 2nd, and 3rd rows are arranged following rotation symmetry as in the standard setup: but the 4th row is arranged with reflection symmetry, so that the pawns of bulls face each other. Note that there is only one camel, but three knights (one knight replaces the missing camel). A sea monster replaces the vizier.

The manuscript does not offer guidance as to how the extra pieces move. Duncan Forbes suggested in 1860 that the lion should combine the moves of rook and giraffe; the bull should combine the moves of picket and giraffe; and the revealer should combine the moves of picket and rook. (He gave the picket the move of the modern bishop, thus making the revealer identical to the modern queen.) Jean-Louis Cazaux suggested in 2012 instead that the extra pieces were simple leapers: the lion a (3,0)-leaper, the bull a (3,2)-leaper, and the revealer a (3,3)-leaper. Both assume that the sea monster is identical to the vizier: a (1,0)-leaper.

Tamerlane Chess Club
A public chess club in Jamestown, New York, named Tamerlane Chess Club, is dedicated to this game as well as other ancient chess variants.

Notes

References

Further reading

External links
 Tamerlane chess by Hans Bodlaender at The Chess Variant Pages
 Rudolph, Jess; ed. 
 Cazaux, Jean-Louis (28/09/2012). "Tamerlane Chess", History.Chess.Free.Fr.
 Tamerlane Chess a simple program by Ed Friedlander (Java)

Abstract strategy games
History of chess
Chess variants
Chess in Iran
Medieval chess
14th century in Iran
Sports originating in Iran